Monticello Airport  is a city-owned, public-use airport located three nautical miles (6 km) north of the central business district of Monticello, a city in San Juan County, Utah, United States. The airport's current site on the east side of U.S. Route 191 opened in 2011, replacing the former Monticello Airport (FAA: U43) which was located on the west side of the highway.

Facilities and aircraft 
Monticello Airport covers an area of 264 acres (107 ha) at an elevation of 6,966 feet (2,123 m) above mean sea level. It has one runway designated 16/34 with an asphalt surface measuring 6,000 by 75 feet (1,829 x 23 m).

For the 12-month period ending December 31, 2010, the airport had 2,310 aircraft operations, an average of 192 per month: 98% general aviation and 2% air taxi. At that time there were 10 aircraft based at this airport: nine single-engine and one multi-engine.

Former airport 
The former Monticello Airport  was located at coordinates  and covered an area of 75 acres (30 ha) at an elevation of 6,998 feet (2,133 m) above mean sea level. It had one runway designated 16/34 with an asphalt surface measuring 4,817 by 75 feet (1,468 x 23 m). According to the FAA's National Plan of Integrated Airport Systems for 2009–2013, it was categorized as a general aviation facility. This airport saw commuter airline service by at least three carriers from the 1970s through the 1990s. Sun Valley Key Commuter, Transwestern Airlines, and Alpine Air all provided direct flights to Moab and Salt Lake City.

References

External links 

 Airport page at City of Monticello website
 Aerial image of former airport location, as of July 1997 from USGS The National Map
 

Airports in Utah
Buildings and structures in San Juan County, Utah
Transportation in San Juan County, Utah